Yanzhou Coal Mining Company Limited , majority owned by Yankuang Group, is a coal mining company in Mainland China. It is engaged in underground mining coal preparation and sales, and railway transportation service of coal. Its products are mainly low-sulphur coal which is suitable for large-scale power plant and for use in pulverized coal injection.

Corporate governance
Its headquarters is located in Zoucheng, Jining, Shandong. Its chairman is Mr. Zhang Xinwen. The company's parent and ultimate holding company is Yankuang Group Corporation Limited (a state-owned enterprise).

Businesses
Yanzhou Coal  is principally engaged in underground coal mining, preparation and processing, sales, and railway transportation of coal. The company is organized into three operating divisions: coal mining, coal railway transportation and methanol and electrical power.

The coal mining segment is engaged in the underground mining, preparation and sales of coal. The coal railway transportation segment is engaged in the provision of railway transportation services. The methanol and electricity power segment is engaged in the production and sales of methanol and electrical power.

The company operates six coal mines: Xinglongzhuang coal mine, Baodian coal mine, Nantun coal mine, Dongtan coal mine, Jining II coal mine (Jining II) and Jining III coal mine (Jining III), as well as a regional rail network that links these mines with the national rail network.

Subsidiaries 
Yanzhou Coal's subsidiaries include Heze, Felix Resources, Yancoal, Shandong Yanmei Shipping Co., Ltd., Yanzhou Coal Yulin Power Chemical Co., Ltd., Zhongyan Trade Co., Ltd, Shanxi Neng Hua, Shanxi Tianchi and Shanxi Tianhao. During the year ended December 31, 2008, the Company sold 37.56 million tons of salable coal. The customers of Yanzhou Coal are mainly located in Eastern China, Southern China and the East Asia such as Japan and South Korea.

Carbon footprint
Yanzhou Coal reported Total CO2e emissions (Direct + Indirect) for 31 December 2020 at 9,883 Kt (+3,875/+64% y-o-y). Emissions have been growing strongly since 2018.

References

External links

 Yanzhou Coal Mining Company 

Companies formerly in the Hang Seng China Enterprises Index
Companies listed on the Hong Kong Stock Exchange
Companies listed on the Shanghai Stock Exchange
Companies listed on the New York Stock Exchange
Coal companies of China
Government-owned companies of China
Companies based in Shandong
Jining